Edmund Turnor (24 March 1838 – 15 December 1903) was an English Conservative Party politician who sat in the House of Commons from 1868 to 1880.

Turnor was the son of Christopher Turnor,  M.P. for South Lincolnshire 1841–47, and his wife  Lady Caroline Finch-Hatton, daughter of George Finch-Hatton, 10th Earl of Winchilsea, and grandson of antiquarian Edmund Turnor (1755–1829). He was educated at Harrow School and at Christ Church, Oxford, graduating B.A. in 1860. He was a Deputy Lieutenant of Lincolnshire, and a J.P. for parts of Kesteven and Lindsey in Lincolnshire.

Turnor was elected as a Member of Parliament (MP) for Grantham at a by-election in April 1868. At the 1868 general election Turnor was elected MP for  South Lincolnshire. He held the seat until 1880.

Turnor died at the age of 65.

Turnor married Lady Mary Katherine Gordon, daughter of Charles Gordon, 10th Marquess of Huntly in 1866. They had 12 children.

References

External links

1838 births
1903 deaths
Conservative Party (UK) MPs for English constituencies
UK MPs 1865–1868
UK MPs 1868–1874
UK MPs 1874–1880
People educated at Harrow School
Alumni of Christ Church, Oxford
Deputy Lieutenants of Lincolnshire